Sean Burns (born 6 October 1991, in Rutherglen) is a Scottish semi-professional footballer who plays for Pollok as a utility player. He made over 200 Scottish League appearances for Queen's Park and was capped by Scotland at U19 level.

Club career

St Mirren 
A product of the St Mirren youth system, Burns won his maiden calls into the first team squad for two late-2007–08 season matches, but remained an unused substitute during both. He signed his first professional contract in May 2008. Burns made his senior debut for the club as a substitute for Dennis Wyness after 72 minutes of a 2–2 Scottish Premier League draw with Falkirk on 14 February 2009. He made two further substitute appearances during the 2008–09 season, but failed to appear again before his release at the end of the 2009–10 season.

Airdrie United 
On 19 August 2010, Burns joined Second Division club Airdrie United on a contract running until the end of the year. He made four appearances before his release.

Queen's Park 
In April 2010, Burns joined Scottish Third Division club Queen's Park on a contract running until the end of the 2010–11 season. He appeared in the Spiders' Second Division play-off campaign, but could not help the team to promotion. Burns signed a new contract in July 2011 and remained at Hampden Park until the end of the 2017–18 season, but which time he had made 265 appearances and scored 26 goals for the club. He was a part of the team that was promoted from League Two at the end of the 2015–16 season and was voted the club's Player of the Year. He also captained the team and played in every outfield position.

Brechin City 
On 27 May 2018, Burns transferred to League One club Brechin City. He made 36 appearances and scored two goals during a dreadful 2018–19 season, which culminated in relegation to League Two. Burns departed Glebe Park at the end of the season.

Forfar Athletic 
On 29 May 2019, Burns joined League One club Forfar Athletic on a one-year contract. He made 13 appearances and scored one goal before his departure in January 2020.

Stenhousemuir 
On 25 January 2020, Burns transferred to League Two club Stenhousemuir on a contract running until the end of the 2019–20 season. He made four appearances before he was released.

Stranraer 
On 5 July 2020, Burns signed a contract with newly-relegated League Two club Stranraer. He made 18 appearances during a 2020–21 season which ended with a semi-final defeat in the League One play-offs. Named vice-captain, Burns remained at Stair Park for 2021–22 and made 35 appearances during a mid-table season, scoring two goals. Work commitments led to his departure from the club in June 2022.

Pollok

In June 2022, Burns signed a two-year contract with West of Scotland League Premier Division club Pollok.

International career 
Burns was capped by Scotland at U19 level.

Career statistics

Honours 
Queen's Park

 Scottish League One play-offs: 2016

Individual

 Queen's Park Player of the Year: 2015–16

References

External links
 (St Mirren stats)
 (Airdrie United stats)

Sean Burns at pollokfc.com

Living people
1991 births
Scottish footballers
St Mirren F.C. players
Airdrieonians F.C. players
Queen's Park F.C. players
Scottish Premier League players
Sportspeople from Rutherglen
Association football midfielders
Brechin City F.C. players
Forfar Athletic F.C. players
Stenhousemuir F.C. players
Scottish Professional Football League players
Association football utility players
Stranraer F.C. players
Footballers from South Lanarkshire
Pollok F.C. players
West of Scotland Football League players